Gaynor Kay Mellor (born 26 August 1971),  better known as Gaynor Faye, is an English actress and writer, best known for playing Judy Mallett in  Coronation Street from 1995 until 1999 and Megan Macey in Emmerdale from 2012 until 2019.

Career
Faye has played the roles of Holly Quinn in Playing the Field; Lauren Harris in Fat Friends; Georgia Lovett in Between the Sheets and Julie in Stan the Man. She has also written two episodes of Fat Friends.

In 2006, Faye appeared in ITV's Dancing on Ice. Her skating partner was  Daniel Whiston. On 4 March 2006, she was crowned the inaugural Dancing on Ice champion.

From 2006 to 2007, Faye starred as Anna Williams Bedford in The Chase, a television series co-written with her mother for BBC One.

She has also brought out a video based on the exercise routine she followed during Dancing on Ice.

Faye appeared in the stage adaptation of Calendar Girls alongside Lynda Bellingham at London's Noël Coward Theatre in 2009. This was written by Juliette Towhidi and Tim Firth.

In September 2010, she was a guest panellist on ITV's Loose Women.

In 2011, Faye played  Zarina Wix in children's programme, Dani's House.

In October 2011, it was announced that Faye would join the ITV soap opera Emmerdale, playing Declan Macey's ambitious half-sister Megan Macey. Megan first appeared on-screen on 21 February 2012. Faye left the role in 2019.

On 11 November and 16 December 2011, she guest presented the ITV Breakfast programme Lorraine.

In March 2021, Faye appeared in the BBC One drama The Syndicate as Cheryl Armitage.

Since 2021, Faye has narrated Hornby: A Model World following the works of Hornby, Scalextrix, and Airfix on the Yesterday channel.

Personal life and family
Gaynor Faye was born in Leeds to TV scriptwriter Kay Mellor and Anthony Mellor. Her maternal grandmother was Jewish. She has one sister, Yvonne.

Faye lives with long-term partner Mark Pickering in Leeds, West Yorkshire. The couple have two children.

Awards and nominations

References

External links

1971 births
Living people
English television actresses
English soap opera actresses
Reality show winners
Actresses from Leeds
English people of Jewish descent
People educated at Lawnswood School